Banarsi Prasad Singh (7 November 1899 – 1964) was an Indian politician. He was elected to the Lok Sabha, the lower house of the Parliament of India, from Munger in Bihar as a member of the  Indian National Congress in 1952, 1957 and 1962.

He took part in various Congress movements and was imprisoned several times. 

He died in 1964. The by-election triggered by his death was won by the socialist leader Madhu Limaye.

References

External links
Official biographical sketch in Parliament of India website

1899 births
1964 deaths
India MPs 1952–1957
India MPs 1957–1962
India MPs 1962–1967
Indian National Congress politicians from Bihar
People from Munger district